Tom White (16 November 1917 – 30 January 1985) was a British middle-distance runner. He competed in the 800 metres at the 1948 Summer Olympics and the 1952 Summer Olympics.

References

1917 births
1985 deaths
Athletes (track and field) at the 1948 Summer Olympics
Athletes (track and field) at the 1950 British Empire Games
Athletes (track and field) at the 1952 Summer Olympics
British male middle-distance runners
Olympic athletes of Great Britain
Place of birth missing